David Russell  (30 March 1911 – February 1945) was a lance corporal with the 22nd (Motor) Battalion, New Zealand Infantry, 2nd NZEF, who was awarded the George Cross posthumously after being executed by German forces in Italy.

Russell was born in Ayr, Scotland, son of James and Jessie Russell, of Corsehill, Ayrshire, but the family emigrated to New Zealand. He worked as an orderly at Napier Hospital in Hawke's Bay before enlisting in the New Zealand Army in September 1939.

He was captured at Reweisat Ridge in Egypt in 1942 and taken to a POW camp in Italy. He escaped and helped Italians who were assisting other Allied POWs to escape. He was particularly active in the Ponte di Piave township and district between 22–28 February 1945 but was recaptured.

Russell refused to name the Italians he had assisted, and was shot by firing squad. A German officer who witnessed the execution said he died very bravely.

His George Cross is displayed at the QEII Army Memorial Museum, Waiouru, New Zealand. On Sunday 2 December 2007, it was among a dozen medals stolen from the museum. On 16 February 2008 New Zealand Police announced all the medals had been recovered as a result of a NZ$300,000 reward offered by Michael Ashcroft and Tom Sturgess.

References

Bibliography
The New Zealand Almanac 

1911 births
1945 deaths
People from East Ayrshire
British emigrants to New Zealand
New Zealand Army personnel
New Zealand military personnel killed in World War II
New Zealand recipients of the George Cross
World War II prisoners of war held by Germany
World War II prisoners of war held by Italy
Deaths by firearm in Italy
New Zealand prisoners of war in World War II
People from Napier, New Zealand
British people executed by Nazi Germany
New Zealand escapees
Escapees from German detention
Executed New Zealand people
People executed by Nazi Germany by firing squad
New Zealand people executed by Nazi Germany
New Zealand military personnel of World War II